Amin Syarifudin (born April 14, 1982) is an Indonesian footballer that currently plays for PSPS Pekanbaru in the Indonesia Super League.

References

External links

1982 births
Association football goalkeepers
Living people
Indonesian footballers
Liga 1 (Indonesia) players
Mitra Kukar players
Persita Tangerang players
Indonesian Premier Division players
Persekabpas Pasuruan players
Persikota Tangerang players
Persiter Ternate players
Sportspeople from Banten